Swanton, Vermont may refer to:

Swanton (town), Vermont
Swanton (village), Vermont, located within the above town